Walid Belhamri (born 19 November 1990 in Bouinan, Algeria) is an Algerian professional footballer who plays for IB Khémis El Khechna.

Statistics

References

External links

1990 births
Living people
Algerian footballers
Algerian Ligue 2 players
People from Blida Province
Association football midfielders
Olympique de Médéa players
USM Blida players
AS Khroub players
MC El Eulma players
WA Tlemcen players
JS Saoura players
21st-century Algerian people